Ciarán Toner (born 30 June 1981) is a Northern Irish football coach and former professional footballer.

As a player, he played as a midfielder from 2000 to 2015. He came through the youth academy at Premier League side Tottenham Hotspur and was promoted to the club's first team during the 2000–01 season, but after loans to both Peterborough United and Bristol Rovers he was eventually released in 2002 without playing a first-team game for the club. He then spent two years with Leyton Orient before joining Lincoln City for the 2004–05 season. He was loaned out to Cambridge United later that season but ended up suffering relegation to the Conference National with Cambridge while his parent club lost out on promotion in the League Two Play-off final. Following a trial he signed for Grimsby Town the following season and remained with The Mariners for three seasons and suffered a play-off final defeat in his first year whilst finishing joint top scorer in his second season. In the summer of 2008 he joined Rochdale and was part of the side that earned promotion to League One during the 2009–10 campaign. He left the club shortly afterwards to pursue other interests and moved into non-League football for the first time in his career by signing for Conference North sides Harrogate Town, and a year later Guiseley. He remained clubless for the entire 2012–13 season to pursue a career in coaching and later joined the coaching staff at Rotherham United before returning to playing at the age of 32 when he signed with Gainsborough Trinity in September 2013 combining, both, playing and coaching. He, quickly moved up the ranks at Rotherham United from under-15 to under-18 coach in the space of 5 years and is, currently, the lead professional development phase coach.

He has also earned two caps in 2003 for Northern Ireland and earned 17 caps, scoring once, for the Northern Ireland U21 side.

Club career

Tottenham Hotspur
Toner was promoted to the first team setup at White Hart Lane at the beginning of the 2000–01 season. He failed to make an appearance for the club in his two seasons at the Premiership outfit, but spent time on loan with Peterborough United and Bristol Rovers, before being released at the end of the 2001–02 season.

Leyton Orient
His next port of call was to sign with Leyton Orient. He made his debut for the Brisbane Road club on the opening day of the 2002–03 season, with a 3–2 victory over Macclesfield Town. Toner went on to make just over 60 appearances for the club in his two-season stay. He scored twice, his first coming in a 1–1 away draw with Hull City on 31 August 2002. While with Orient, Toner impressed enough to be called up to the Northern Ireland international team, where he played in two games, against Spain and Italy.

Lincoln City
At the start of the 2004–05 season, Toner was signed by Lincoln City manager Keith Alexander on a one-year deal. He became a first team regular at Sincil Bank, scoring vital goals in victories over the club's rivals Grimsby Town and Mansfield Town. Toner made 17 appearances for The Imps, scoring twice, before being loaned out to Cambridge United later that season. Toner made eight appearances for United, and the club were eventually relegated from the Football League at the end of the season.

Grimsby Town
During July 2005, Toner joined up with Grimsby Town on an initial trial period he was one of many players on trial at the club that summer and was invited by the club to take part in their pre-season British Army boot camp. Shortly before the start of the season Town manager Russell Slade rewarded Toner with a one-year contract, to which he accepted. In his first season with Grimsby Toner initially found it hard to break up Slade's favoured central midfield role of Paul Bolland and Jean-Paul Kamudimba Kalala. It wasn't until Kalala joined up with the DR Congo international side for the African Nations Cup midway through the 2005–06 season that Toner began to find his feet in the first team. Toner, however, would eventually lose his place again when Slade signed Curtis Woodhouse in the January transfer window. Grimsby would go on to defeat former side Lincoln City in the Play-off semi-finals before finally losing out in the final at the Millennium Stadium to Cheltenham Town, Toner however was an unused substitute in the final. In his second season at Blundell Park, Toner finished joint top scorer with eight goals, as he played a large part in keeping Alan Buckley's side in the Football League. Toner was rewarded and signed a new two-year deal in the summer of 2007. On 26 June 2008 it was confirmed that Toner would leave the club after agreeing with the club to cancel his contract, despite having one year remaining on the deal. While at Grimsby, Toner managed to score some important goals, two of them goals came against his former side Lincoln City, in the clubs local derbys. One of them came in a 3–0 home win for The Mariners in 2005, while the other came in a 2–1 away win for Grimsby in 2007. He had previously scored in 2004 for Lincoln in the same fixture.

Rochdale
Immediately after his release from Grimsby, he signed a deal with fellow League Two side Rochdale. He did not feature in Rochdale's first game of the season, against former club Grimsby Town at Blundell Park and instead, Toner made his debut against Oldham Athletic in the League Cup and throughout the 2008–09 season he became a first team regular mainly featuring alongside veteran Gary Jones in the centre of midfield. Toner became an integral part of the Dale side by making 37 appearances and scoring a wonder strike against Aldershot Town. Rochdale went on to finish sixth in the league and claim a play-off spot, but lost out in the final.

Toner had a race to be fit for the opening day of the 2009–10 football season after having problems with his ear drum in Rochdale's pre-season training camp in Marbella before suffering from shin splints which made him miss the rest of Rochdale's pre season matches. Toner won his race by being named as an unused substitute for Rochdale's opening day fixture to Port Vale. Dale were promoted to League One at the end of the season after finishing third in the table despite leading the league for a lengthy period of the season.

Harrogate Town
In August 2010 he signed for Conference North outfit Harrogate Town. He made his debut on 28 August 2010 in a 6–3 defeat to Boston United. On 4 September 2010, he scored his first goal for the club in a 2–2 draw at home to Hinckley United.

Guiseley
In July 2011 he joined Guiseley reuniting him with former Grimsby teammates Danny Boshell and Jamie Clarke. After losing in the Conference North play-off semi-finals, he was released at the end of the 2011–12 season.

Gainsborough Trinity
On 13 September 2013, after spending time with Rotherham United as a coach during the 2012–13 season, Conference North side Gainsborough Trinity announced the signing of Toner on a non-contract basis.

International career
In 2003, Toner was called up to play for Northern Ireland in two matches for his country, replacing Damien Johnson in a friendly against Italy, and Thomas Doherty in a 0–0 draw with Spain.

Coaching career
During the 2012–13 season, Toner took a break from playing football and joined York City as Under 14 coach while studying for his UEFA A Licence qualification. The following season he joined League Two side Rotherham United's coaching staff. In the summer of 2013 he returned to the playing side of the game with Gainsborough Trinity. whilst continuing his coaching journey with Rotherham.

Toner held the role of Lead Professional Development Phase coach at Rotherham United until October 2020.

Honours
with Rochdale AFC
Football League Two Play-off semi finalist: 2008-09
Football League Two Goal of the season: 2008-09
Football League Two Promotion to League One: 2009-10

with Grimsby Town
Football League Two Play-off runner up: 2005–06
Football League Two Joint Top Scorer: 2006-07
Football League Trophy runner up: 2007–08

with Lincoln City
Football League Two Play-off runner up: 2004–05

References

External links
Profile of Ciarán Toner at UpThePosh! The Peterborough United Database

Profile of Ciarán Toner at codalmighty.com

1981 births
Living people
People from Craigavon, County Armagh
Association footballers from Northern Ireland
Northern Ireland international footballers
Tottenham Hotspur F.C. players
Peterborough United F.C. players
Bristol Rovers F.C. players
Leyton Orient F.C. players
Lincoln City F.C. players
Grimsby Town F.C. players
Cambridge United F.C. players
Rochdale A.F.C. players
Harrogate Town A.F.C. players
Guiseley A.F.C. players
Gainsborough Trinity F.C. players
Rotherham United F.C. non-playing staff
Association football midfielders